Wickenden Street in Fox Point, Providence, Rhode Island is a popular destination for students of the area's colleges and schools.  The street is surrounded by schools and universities on the East Side of Providence's College Hill, including Brown University, RISD, Moses Brown School, & The Wheeler School.

History
The street is named after a rebellious British minister, William Wickenden, who had a farm on the original strip of land comprising modern day Wickenden Street.  Wickenden was one of the first settlers in Providence in the 17th century. The area was home to a large Portuguese-American community starting in the 19th century. In 1885 Bishop Hendricken organized one of the first Portuguese-American churches in the area on the site of a former Wickenden Street skating rink. Some of the houses on the Street are still painted in pastel colors in the Portuguese style.

Today, Wickenden Street has numerous independent shops, art galleries, a farmer's market, and restaurants that are popular among local artists, professors and students.

See also
College Hill, Providence, Rhode Island
Thayer Street

External links
Wickenden Area Merchants Association

References

Brown University
Geography of Providence, Rhode Island
Roads in Rhode Island
Shopping districts and streets in the United States